Povel is a given name and a surname. People with that name include:

Given name
 Povel Huitfeldt ( - 1592), Danish-Norwegian governor-general of Norway
 Povel Juel ( – 1723), Norwegian civil servant and writer
 Povel Pedersson Paus (1625-1682), Norwegian cleric
 Povel Ramel (1922-2007), Swedish entertainer

Surname
 Hans Povel (born ), retired Dutch rower
  (born 1947), Dutch jazz saxophonist

See also
 Cornelis sjunger Povel, a 1981 album by Cornelis Vreeswijk named after Povel Ramel
 Pavel, a given name and surname